Lake Cowichan (Nitinaht: ʕaʔk̓ʷaq c̓uubaʕsaʔtx̣) (pop. 2,974) is a town located on the east end of Cowichan Lake and, by highway, is  west of Duncan, British Columbia. The town of Lake Cowichan was incorporated in 1944. The Cowichan River flows through the middle of the town. Cowichan River is designated as a Heritage River.

Youbou, with a population of about 1,000 people; Mesachie Lake, with a population of about 800 people; and Honeymoon Bay with a population of about 600 people, are nearby communities.

Climate
Lake Cowichan is surrounded on all sides by the Pacific Northwest Temperate rainforest, containing the largest, tallest, and oldest trees in the world outside of California.

Lake Cowichan has an oceanic climate (Cfb) with warm summers and cool winters.

Demographics 

Ethnicity 
Lake Cowichan is one of several towns in the Cowichan Valley with significant South Asian Canadian (primarily Sikh-Canadian) community history for over 130 years, gaining notoriety in the forestry industry at local sawmills from the early 20th century until the 1980s.

Religion 
According to the 2021 census, religious groups in Lake Cowichan included:
Irreligion (2,290 persons or 69.1%)
Christianity (965 persons or 29.1%)
Sikhism (25 persons or 0.8%)
Judaism (10 persons or 0.3%)
Other (25 persons or 0.8%)

Politics
In the Legislative Assembly of British Columbia, Lake Cowichan is represented by Sonia Furstenau -Green Party of British Columbia, representing the riding of Cowichan Valley.
In the House of Commons of Canada, Lake Cowichan is represented by Alistair MacGregor-New Democratic Party, representing the riding of Cowichan-Malahat-Langford.

The election results for the town of Lake Cowichan for the past five Federal General Elections were:

43rd Federal General Election of 2019:  New Democratic Party 40.4%, Conservative Party 24.4%, Green Party 19.5%, Liberal Party 13.0%, People's Party 2.3%, Christian Heritage Party 0.4%.

42nd Federal General Election of 2015:
New Democratic Party 35.94%, Liberal Party 23.77%, Conservative Party 22.81%, Green Party 16.93%, and Marxist-Leninist Party 0.55%.

41st Federal General Election of 2011:  New Democratic Party 53.9%, Conservative Party 34.2%, Green Party 7.2%, Liberal Party 3.7% and Marxist-Leninist Party 0.6%.

40th Federal General Election of 2008:  New Democratic Party 52.1%, Conservative Party 32.8%, Green Party 7.9%, Liberal Party 6.5% and Marxist-Leninist Party 0.6%.

39th Federal General Election of 2006:  New Democratic Party 57.5%, Conservative Party 25.8%, Liberal Party  11.7%, Green Party  3.9%, Marxist-Leninist Party 0.5% and Canadian Action Party  0.4%.

Notable residents
See also :Category:People from Duncan, British Columbia
 Brad Palmer, former NHL player
 Brian Lundberg, former NHL player
 Steve Lingren, former AHL, ECHL hockey player
 Dan Boeckner, singer, songwriter
 Fritz Perls, co-founder of Gestalt therapy
 William Carpentier, flight surgeon for Apollo 11

References

External links

Towns in British Columbia
Populated places in the Cowichan Valley Regional District
Cowichan Valley